Land of Make Believe or The Land of Make Believe may refer to:

Music 
"Land of Make Believe" (Easybeats song), 1968
Land of Make Believe (Chuck Mangione album), 1973
Land of Make Believe (Kidz in the Hall album), 2010
"The Land of Make Believe", a 1980 song by Bucks Fizz
"The Land of Make-Believe", a song by R. Nelson, U. Ray, D. Alex recorded by Fats Domino
"The Land of Make Believe", a song by R. Miller and A. Miller, performed by Diana Ross and the Supremes from The Never-Before-Released Masters
"The Land of Make-Believe", a song by The Moody Blues from the Seventh Sojourn album
"(In the) Land of Make Believe", a song written by Burt Bacharach & Hal David and sung by The Drifters, Dionne Warwick, Dusty Springfield and others

Other 
Land of Make Believe (amusement park), an amusement park in Hope Township, New Jersey, United States
Land of Makebelieve, a former amusement park in Upper Jay, New York, United States
The Neighborhood of Make-Believe, a segment on the children's television program Mister Rogers' Neighborhood